John Edward Raker (February 22, 1863 – January 22, 1926) was an American lawyer and politician who served as a Democratic Party Congressional representative for California, serving eight terms from 1911 to 1926.

Life
He was born near Knoxville, Knox County, Illinois, on February 22, 1863, and moved with his parents, Christian Raker and Mary E. (née Rambo) Raker, to Lassen County, California, in 1873. After attending public school and the State normal school at San Jose from 1882–1884, he studied law. He was admitted to the bar in 1885 and began practicing law in Susanville. On December 6, 1886, he moved to Alturas. He was District Attorney of Modoc County from 1895–1899, and Judge of the Superior Court of Modoc County from January 5, 1903, to December 19, 1910, when he resigned.

Political career 
In 1898 he stood as a candidate for the California state senate, and was a superior court judge in California, from 1905 until 1910.

Raker was chairman of the Democratic State central committee from 1908–1910. He was a delegate to the Democratic National Convention at Denver in 1908. Elected as a Democrat to the sixty-second United States Congress in 1911, and to the seven succeeding Congresses, he served from March 4, 1911, until his death in Washington, D.C., on January 22, 1926. He represented the 1st District from 1911–13, and the 2nd District from 1913-26.  Raker also introduced the legislation that created Lassen National Volcanic Park in 1916.

In 1911, he tried unsuccessfully to introduce legislation for the creation of the Redwood National and State Parks. In stark contrast, in the next session he was the main sponsor of what came to be known the Raker Act, passed in 1913 and signed into law by President Woodrow Wilson in 1914. The Act authorized the damming of the Tuolumne River and the flooding of the Hetch Hetchy Valley, which remain controversial to this day.

In the sixty-fifth Congress, he held the office of Chairman of the Committee on Expenditures in the Department of Justice, and the Committee on Woman Suffrage.

Private life
He was a member of the Freemasons and the Odd Fellows.

He is buried at Susanville Cemetery in Susanville, California.

Family
He married Iva G. Spencer on November 21, 1889.

See also
List of United States Congress members who died in office (1900–49)

References

Attribution

External links

Political Graveyard entry
 

Democratic Party members of the United States House of Representatives from California
1863 births
1926 deaths
People from Knoxville, Illinois
People from Susanville, California
District attorneys in California